Les Dunn (16 February 1915 – 26 October 2009) was an  Australian rules footballer who played with South Melbourne in the Victorian Football League (VFL).

Notes

External links 

1915 births
2009 deaths
Australian rules footballers from Victoria (Australia)
Sydney Swans players